War chief may refer to

 Warlord, a leader able to exercise military, economic, and political control over a subnational territory within a sovereign state due to their ability to mobilize loyal armed forces
 Tribal war chief during wartime, particularly among indigenous peoples of the Americas
 The War Chief, a Time Lord character in the Doctor Who serial The War Games
Age of Empires III: The WarChiefs

See also

Chief (disambiguation)
War (disambiguation)
Warlord (disambiguation)
 Master of War (disambiguation)